Sensational Janine is a 1976 West German hardcore costume drama-sex comedy film directed by Hans Billian. The film is an adaptation of the anonymous early 20th century novel Josephine Mutzenbacher on the sexual awakening of the eponymous and fictional fin-de-siècle Viennese courtesan.

Background
Sensational Janine features director Hans Billian's girlfriend Patricia Rhomberg in the title role. Billian gave her the role in part due to the fact that she had the proper dialect. Sensational Janine became the first pornographic film to feature a humorous Viennese German, which contributed significantly to its popularity among the German-speaking audience.

In the original novel, Josefine is a Viennese teen who is very curious about sex. After she is deflowered by her neighbor Frau Reinthaler's lover Horak, she begins a very active sex life. Following her mother's abrupt demise, she engages in a relationship with her stepfather. A lodger blackmails the two with the accusation of incest. The lodger is then revealed to be a pimp and turns Josefine into one of his prostitutes. This is the start of Josefine’s career as a sex worker; though her later life is not detailed in the novel, she eventually becomes an upscale courtesan in Vienna.

Synopsis

Josefine discovers her stepbrother masturbating while listening to their parents having intercourse. The step-siblings engage in mutual masturbation until they both orgasm. They then go to her room and attempt intercourse; it is painful for her so she offers to use her mouth, and they perform sixty-nine until he climaxes.

Josefine determines to learn all that she can about sex. She spies upon and masturbates to her stepfather Mr. Gray having sex with the widow Mrs. Peabody and her mother having sex with boarder Mr. Baker. She tries to entice Baker with her decolletage but is scolded by her mother. Josefine later follows Peabody to the basement and catches her having sex with tavern-owner Mr. Hutchison, who is storing rum there. Hutchison tries to bribe Josefine to keep the secret, but Josefine seduces him and shames Peabody. Josefine then loses her virginity to Hutchison. Later, while masturbating naked in front of a mirror, Josefine realizes that her breasts are developing.

Josefine's mother is hospitalized with pneumonia while her stepbrother is away for military service. After her stepfather leaves for work, Josefine awakens Baker with a handjob and they engage in numerous sex acts initiated by Josefine. She then goes to make Baker's breakfast and while naked in the kitchen her stepfather walks in and announces that her mother is dead. Josefine's feelings of guilt lead her to sexual abstinence, though she masturbates to fall asleep at night. She finds that her stepfather is doing the same thing, and after he falls asleep she tells him that she's sorry while caressing her breasts.

Josefine's stepfather makes her an appointment with a priest, who asks her to confess her sins. She doesn't know how to respond so the priest offers to purify her with his tongue and performs cunnilingus. Overcome with lust, Josefine performs various sex acts with the priest; her friend Maresi catches them and joins in a threesome. Josefine then accompanies Maresi to her mansion, pausing to have sex with their carriage driver in a field, and they have an orgy with two house servants during which the women have lesbian sex with each other. Josefine expresses her envy at the number of virile men Maresi has at her disposal.

Josefine is required to sleep in her stepfather's bed when he takes on another lodger, and she explains that she prefers to sleep in the nude. Josefine enjoys her stepfather having sex with her while she pretends to be asleep and after a few times she breaks and has passionate sex with him, telling him that he can do so every night. They make a pact to keep it a secret, but while having sex in the kitchen the lodger catches them and blackmails her to have sex with him. Later, the lodger brings prostitute Zenzi and they have an orgy with Josefine and her stepfather, and the four have sex together regularly. One morning, the lodger and stepfather persuade Josefine to become an adult film star.

Josephine takes a stroll when a handsome man asks her to come to his mansion. There, while he leaves to attend to something, Josephine begins having sex with a servant.  She stops midway and breaks the fourth wall by telling the audience that if they want to see more of her they should go and watch her newest film.

Cast
Patricia Rhomberg as Josefine Mutzenbacher ("Janine")
Sepp Gneißl (Sepp Gneissl) as Eckhard, the first lodger
Frithjof Klausen as Josefine's stepfather
Siggi Buchner as Horak, the delivery man
Birgit Zamulo as Maresi, the rich girl
Peter Holzmüller as Priest
Marie-France Morel as Zenzi, the older prostitute
Edgar Wenzel as Police commissioner

Legacy
American pornographic film critic Jim Holliday described this film as "easily the best and most accurate of several films based on the life and adventures of legendary Viennese madam Josephine Mutzenbacher" and his "all time foreign favorite" adult film. The Film Journal described Sensational Janine as "one of the most successful foreign X-rated films ever to cross the Atlantic." A review on TV Kult stated that the movie is "today seen as one of the best porns of all time". Pornoklassiker called it "possibly the best German pornographic film."

References

External links

1976 films
West German films
German sex comedy films
German pornographic films
1970s German-language films
1970s sex comedy films
1970s pornographic films
Films about prostitution in Austria
German coming-of-age films
Films set in the 1890s
Films set in Vienna
Films based on Austrian novels
1976 comedy films
1970s German films